Pati Parameshwar is a Bengali comedy film directed by Jayasree Bhattacharyya based on a story written by Subhranil Biswas. This film is being produced and presented by Anjan Kumar Roy. The film features Rituparna Sengupta, Rajatava Dutta, Rahul Arunodoy Banerjee, Bobby Chakraborty and Sudipta Chakraborty. Music of the film is composed by Surojit Chatterjee.

Plot 
The film revolves around the life of a childless couple, Arindam, a police officer and his beautiful wife, Sharmila. They have a pet dog named Pluto, who accidentally runs off on a summer afternoon. What follows afterwards in the life of this couple is what the film is all about.

Cast 
 Rituparna Sengupta as Sharmila Chatterjee
 Rajatava Dutta as Arindam Chatterjee
 Rahul Arunodoy Banerjee as Amol
 B.D Mukherjee as Jethu
 Supriyo Dutta as Commissioner of Police
 Bobby Chakraborty as KLo or Keshav Lodh
 Biswanath Basu as Dhuni Baba
 Kanchana Moitra as Bhairobi

Production 
The film was shot in a span of 24 days, by Jayashree Bhattacharyya with 103 actors, all across Kolkata and various locations in West Bengal. Produced by Anjan Roy of Holly Bolly Tolly Kolly productions. To be released by Eskay Movies.

Music 
Music direction by Surojit Chatterjee of successful films like Kaali Amaar Maa, Icche, Hello Memsaheb, Muktodhara, Handa Bhonda, Halud Pakhir Dana,  Gogoler Kirti. 
Music of the film Pati Parameshwar was recorded at Studio Kusum Kolkata, at Studio Meet Brothers Mumbai. Songs mixed by Vikram Nagi, Mumbai. The title song, Dilli ka laddo, was mixed by Gautam Debnath. 

 "Dilli ka laddoo" lyrics by Surojit Chatterjee featuring Mir and Rituparna Sengupta
 "Dyang Dyang Dyang" lyrics by Kamalinee Chatterjee featuring Akriti Kakkar and Rana Mazumdar
 "Paisa wasool" lyrics by Surojit Chatterjee, Kamalinee Chatterjee, RED Mukherjee, featuring June Banerjee, Rana Mazumder and Surojit Chatterjee
 "Roomal" lyrics by Surojit Chatterjee featuring Surojit Chatterjee, June Banerjee, Rajib Banerjee, Mainak Sengupta.
 "Rabindrasangeet" Medley with Pran Chae chokkhu na chae and Amar Hridoy featuring Jayati Chakraborty and Supratik Das.

Reviews
Madhusree Ghosh of The Times of India gave the film a 2 out of 5 stars.

References

2014 films
Bengali-language Indian films
2010s Bengali-language films